is a Japanese actress, voice actress and tarento from Kagawa Prefecture, Japan.

She is married to actor Ryosuke Otani. They have a son, Yuta Takahata.

Filmography

Drama
  Kyojuu Tokusou Juspion (1985) – Space Witch Gilza
 Kamen Rider Black RX (1988) – Maribaron
 Special Rescue Police Winspector (1990) – Calra/Miyuki Fukano (Episode 27)
 Special Rescue Exceedraft (1992) – Hidemi Takeuchi (Episode 6)
 Tokusou Robo Janperson (1993) – Reiko Ayanokouji
 Kinpachi-sensei (1995) – Kazumi Honda
 Doremisora (2002)
 Shiroi Kyotō (2003) – Masako Azuma
 14-sai no Haha (2006) – Haruko Matoba
 Atsuhime (2008) – Honjuin
 Mother (2010) – Toko Suzuhara
 Kyō wa Kaisha Yasumimasu. (2014) – Mitsuyo Aoishi
 Dr.Rintarō (2015) – Ruriko Aizawa
 Sanada Maru (2016) – Kaoru
 Naomi and Kanako (2016) – Akemi Ri
 Spring Has Come (2017)
 Black Leather Notebook (2017) – Ichiko Nakaoka
 Natsuzora: Natsu's Sky (2019) – Toyo
 Maiagare! (2022–23) – Shōko Saitsu

Film
 Ring Ø: Birthday (2000) – Kaoru Arima
 Spring Snow (2005) – H.R.H. Tohin-nomiya
 Yamato (2005) – Tsune Tamaki
 Usagi Drop (2011) – Yumiko Sugiyama
 Always: Sunset on Third Street '64 (2012) – Natsuko
 Life in Overtime (2018)
 Out and Out (2018)
 The Dignified Death of Shizuo Yamanaka (2020) – Tsuneko Yamanaka
 End-of-Life Concierge (2021)
 The Women (2021)
 Motherhood (2022)
 Shikake-nin Fujieda Baian (2023) – OsekiShikake-nin Fujieda Baian 2 (2023) – Oseki

Anime
 Like the Clouds, Like the Wind (TV, 1990) – Tamyūn
 Iczer Reborn (OVA, 1990) – Neos Gold
 Magic Knight Rayearth (TV, 1994) – Debonair
 X/1999 (Film, 1996) – Kanoe
 Twilight of the Dark Master (OVA, 1998) – Takamiya
 The Tale of the Princess Kaguya (Film, 2013) – Sagami

Dubbing rolesAir Force One (Vice President Kathryn Bennett (Glenn Close))Conan the Destroyer (Queen Taramis (Sarah Douglas))Cold Creek Manor (Leah Tilson (Sharon Stone))Elizabeth (Queen Elizabeth I (Cate Blanchett))Elizabeth: The Golden Age (Queen Elizabeth I (Cate Blanchett))Masters of the Universe (1992 TV Asahi edition) (Evil-Lyn (Meg Foster))Stanley & Iris (Iris King (Jane Fonda))Superman IV: The Quest for Peace'' (Lacy Warfield (Mariel Hemingway))

Honours 
Medal with Purple Ribbon (2014)

References

External links

1954 births
Living people
Japanese musical theatre actresses
Japanese voice actresses
Recipients of the Medal with Purple Ribbon
Voice actors from Kagawa Prefecture
Voice actresses from Kagawa Prefecture